John Eric Rayner Staddon (born 1937) is a British-born American psychologist. He has been a sympathetic critic of Skinnerian behaviorism and proposed a theoretically-based "New Behaviorism".

Biography
Educated first at University College London, a three-year period interrupted by two years in Central Africa (N. Rhodesia, now Zambia). After graduation from UCL, he went to the U. S., to Hollins College in Virginia for a year, and then to Harvard University where he studied under Richard Herrnstein, obtaining his PhD in Experimental Psychology in 1964 with a thesis The effect of "knowledge of results" on timing behavior in the pigeon. He has done research at the MIT Systems Lab, University of Oxford, the University of São Paulo at Ribeirão Preto, the National Autonomous University of Mexico, the Ruhr Universität and Universität Konstanz, Germany, the University of Western Australia and York University, United Kingdom, and taught at the University of Toronto from 1964 to 1967.

Since 1967, Staddon has been at Duke University; since 1983 he has been the James B. Duke Professor of psychology, and a professor of biology and neurobiology. He was an editor of the journals Behavioural Processes (1983-2002) and Behavior & Philosophy (1996-2004). Since 2007 has been professor emeritus.

Books
Science in an age of unreason Regnery (2022)
Handbook of Operant  behavior Englewood Cliffs, N.J.: (1977) Prentice-Hall, co-edited with W. K. Honig
Handbook of Operant  behavior: Classic Edition (2022) Routledge
Scientific Method: How science works, fails to work and pretends to work (Routledge, 2017)
The New Behaviorism: Foundations of behavioral science, 3rd Edition (Psychology Press, 2021)
Adaptive Dynamics:  The Theoretical Analysis of Behavior (MIT/Bradford, 2001)
Adaptive Behavior and Learning, 2nd Edition (Cambridge University Press), 2016. 
The Malign Hand of the Markets. McGraw-Hill, 2012.  Japanese translation: Shijo o ayatsuru jaku na te: Kin'yu shijo o hakai suru miezaru chikara. 
 
Unlucky Strike: Private Health and the Science, Law and Politics of Smoking (Second Edition) (2022) PsyCrit Press, with contributions by David Hockney and Alan Silberberg. 
The Englishman: Memoirs of a Psychobiologist. University of Buckingham Press, 2016.
Staddon, J. E. R.  (Ed.)  (1980).  Limits to action: The allocation of individual behavior.  New York: Academic Press.

References

Selected Publications
Staddon, J. E. R.  (1964).  Reinforcement as input:  Cyclic variable-interval schedule.  Science, 145, 410-412.

Staddon, J. E. R.  (1965).  Some properties of spaced responding in pigeons. Journal of the Experimental Analysis of Behavior, 8, 19-27.

Staddon, J. E. R., & Innis, N. K.  (1966).  An effect analogous to “frustration” on interval reinforcement schedules.  Psychonomic Science, 4, 287-288.

Staddon, J. E. R.  (1968).  Spaced responding and choice: A preliminary analysis.  Journal of the Experimental Analysis of Behavior, 11, 669-682. http://dukespace.lib.duke.edu/dspace/handle/10161/5995

Staddon, J. E. R., & Innis, N. K.  (1969).  Reinforcement omission on fixed-interval schedules.  Journal of the Experimental Analysis of Behavior, 12, 689-700.

Staddon, J. E. R.  (1970).  Temporal effects of reinforcement: A negative “frustration” effect.  Learning and Motivation, 1, 227-247. http://dukespace.lib.duke.edu/dspace/handle/10161/3230 	

Staddon, J. E. R., & Simmelhag, V.  (1971).  The “superstition” experiment: A reexamina-tion of its implications for the principles of adaptive behavior.  Psychological Review, 78, 3-43.  (Reprinted in H. Rachlin (Ed.), Behavior and learning.  San Francisco: W. H. Freeman, 1976.  Listed as a “Citation Classic,” Current Contents, 1981, March 22, 20) http://citeseerx.ist.psu.edu/viewdoc/download?doi=10.1.1.475.6838&rep=rep1&type=pdf

Staddon, J. E. R.  (1973).  On the notion of cause, with applications to behaviorism.  Behaviorism, 1, 25-63.  Reprinted and translated as Sobre a noção de causa: Aplicações ao caso do behaviorismo. Cadernos de História e Filosofia da Ciência. 1981 (4) 48-92.

Staddon, J. E. R.  (1974).  Temporal control, attention and memory.  Psychological Review, 81, 375-391.

Staddon, J. E. R.  (1975).  A note on the evolutionary significance of supernormal stimuli. American Naturalist, 109, 541-545.

Staddon, J. E. R., & Ayres, S.  (1975).  Sequential and temporal properties of behavior induced by a schedule of periodic food delivery. Behaviour, 54, 26-49.

Staddon, J. E. R., & Frank, J. A.  (1975).  Temporal control on periodic schedules: Fine structure.  Bulletin of the Psychonomic Society, 6(5), 536-538. (b) 

Staddon, J. E. R.  (1977).  Behavioral competition in conditioning situations: Notes toward a theory of generalization and inhibition.  In H. Davis & H. M. B. Hurwitz, Operant-Pavlovian interactions.  Hillsdale, N.J.: Erlbaum.

Staddon, J. E. R.  (1977).  On Herrnstein’s equation and related forms. Journal of the Ex-perimental Analysis of Behavior, 28, 163-170. http://www.ncbi.nlm.nih.gov/pmc/articles/PMC1333628/pdf/jeabehav00098-0066.pdf

Staddon, J. E. R.  (1977).  Schedule-induced behavior.  In W. K. Honig & J. E. R. Staddon (Eds.), Handbook of operant behavior.  Englewood Cliffs, N.J.: Prentice-Hall.
  
Staddon, J. E. R.  (1977).  Temporal fine structure of bird song.  Proceedings of the XVth International Ethological Conference (p. 156).

Honig, W. K., & Staddon, J. E. R.  (Eds.).  (1977).  Handbook of operant behavior.  Englewood Cliffs, N.J.: Prentice-Hall. 

Staddon, J. E. R.  (1978).  Theory of behavioral power functions. Psychological Review, 85, 305-320. https://dukespace.lib.duke.edu/dspace/bitstream/handle/10161/6003/Staddon1978.pdf?sequence=1

Hinson, J. M., & Staddon, J. E. R.  (1978).  Behavioral competition: A mechanism for schedule interactions.  Science, 202, 432-434.

Staddon, J. E. R., & Motheral, S.  (1978).  On matching and maximizing in operant choice experiments.  Psychological Review, 85, 436-444.

Staddon, J. E. R., McGeorge, L. W., Bruce, R. A., & Klein, F. F.  (1978).  A simple method for the rapid analysis of animal sounds.  Zeitschrift für Tierpsychologie, 48, 306-330.

Staddon, J. E. R., King, M. & Lockhead, G. R.  (1980).  On sequential effects in absolute judgment experiments.  Journal of Experimental Psychology: Human Perception and Performance, 6(2), 290-301.

Staddon, J. E. R.  (1981).  Cognition in animals: Learning as program assembly. Cognition, 10, 287-294. 

Staddon, J. E. R.  (1981).  On a possible relation between cultural transmission and genet-ical evolution.  In P. Klopfer & P. P. G. Bateson (Eds.), Perspectives in ethology: Vol. 4.  Advantages of diversity.  London: Plenum.

Staddon, J. E. R., Hinson, J. M., &  Kram, R.  (1981).  Optimal choice. Journal of the Ex-perimental Analysis of Behavior, 35, 397-412.

Staddon, J. E. R.  (1982).  Behavioral competition, contrast, and matching. In M. L. Commons, R. J. Herrnstein, & H. Rachlin (Eds.), Quantitative analyses of operant behavior: Matching and maximizing accounts.  Vol. 2 of Quantitative analyses of behavior, a five-volume series (pp. 243- 261).  Cambridge, Mass.: Ballinger.
  
Staddon, J. E. R.  (1982).  On the dangers of demand curves: A comment on Lea and Tarpy.  Behaviour Analysis Letters, 2, 321-325.

Ettinger, R. H., & Staddon, J. E. R.  (1982).  Behavioral competition, component duration and multiple-schedule contrast.  Behaviour Analysis Letters, 2, 31-38.

Reid, A. K., & Staddon, J. E. R.  (1982).  Schedule-induced drinking: Elicitation, anticipation, or behavioral interaction?  Journal of the Experimental Analysis of Behavior, 38, 1-18. 

Starr, B. C., & Staddon, J. E. R.  (1982).  Sensory superstition on multiple interval schedules.  Journal of the Experimental Analysis of Behavior, 37, 267-280. 

Staddon, J. (1983) The Countess Ada Lovelace Diet, Sex, Health, Workout & Database Book. Durham, NC, Microglyphics Press. 

Hinson, J. M., & Staddon, J. E. R.  (1983).  Matching, maximizing and hill climbing. Journal of the Experimental Analysis of Behavior, 40, 321-31. (b)

Gendron, R. P., & Staddon, J. E. R.  (1983).  Searching for cryptic prey: he effect of search rate.  American Naturalist, 121, 172-186. 

Staddon, J. E. R., & Gendron, R. P.  (1983).  Optimal detection of cryptic prey may lead to predator switching.  American Naturalist, 122, 843-848.	
	
Staddon, J. E. R., & Hinson, J. M.  (1983).  Optimization: A result or a mechanism? Science, 221, 976-7. 

Innis, N. K., Simmelhag-Grant, V. L., & Staddon, J. E. R.  (1983).  Behavior induced by periodic food delivery: The effects of interfood interval.  Journal of the Experimental Analysis of Behavior, 39, 309-322. 

Staddon, J. E. R.  (1984).  Skinner’s behaviorism implies a subcutaneous homunculus. Behavioral and Brain Sciences, 7, 647.

Staddon, John (1987) Principles of database management. In Geisow, M. J., & Barrett, A. N. Microcomputers in medicine. Amsterdam: Elsevier. Pp. 55-81.

Horner, J. M., & Staddon, J. E. R. (1987) Probabilistic choice: A simple invariance. Behavioural Processes, 15, 59-92.  http://dukespace.lib.duke.edu/dspace/handle/10161/3231 

Ettinger, R. H., Reid. A. K., & Staddon, J. E. R. (1987) Sensitivity to molar feedback functions: A test of molar optimality theory. Journal of Experimental Psychology: Animal Behavior Processes, 13, 366-375.
	
Wynne, C. D. L., & Staddon, J. E. R. (1988) Typical delay determines waiting time on periodic-food schedules: static and dynamic tests. Journal of the Experimental Analysis of Behavior, 50, 197-210. http://dukespace.lib.duke.edu/dspace/handle/10161/3387 
	
Staddon, J. E. R., & Ettinger, R. H. (1989) Learning: An introduction to the principles of adaptive behavior.  San Diego: Harcourt-Brace-Jovanovich. Pp. i-ix, 1-436.
	
Staddon, J. E. R., & Horner, J. M. (1989) Stochastic choice models: A comparison between Bush-Mosteller and a source-independent reward-following model. Journal of the Experimental Analysis of Behavior, 52, 57-64.
	
Staddon, J. E. R., & Zhang, Y. (1989) Response selection in operant learning. Behavioural Processes, 20,189-97.	
	
Staddon, J. E. R., & Reid, A. K. (1990) On the dynamics of generalization. Psychological Review, 97, 576-578.
	
Fersen, L. von, Wynne, C. D. L., Delius, J. D., & Staddon, J. E. R. (1990) Deductive reasoning in pigeons. Naturwissenschafften, 77, 548-549.
	
Davis, D. G. S. & Staddon, J. E. R. (1990) Memory for reward in probabilistic choice: Markovian and non-Markovian properties.  Behaviour, 114: 37-64.
	
Staddon, J. E. R. & Zhang, Y. (1991) On the assignment-of-credit problem in operant learning. In M. L. Commons, S. Grossberg, & J. E. R. Staddon (Eds.) Neural networks of conditioning and action, the XIIth Harvard Symposium. Hillsdale, NJ: Erlbaum Associates. Pp. 279-293.
	
Commons, M. L., Grossberg, S. & Staddon, J. E. R.(Eds.) (1991) Neural networks of conditioning and action, the XIIth Harvard Symposium. Hillsdale, NJ: Erlbaum Associates. Pp. xx, 359.
	
Fersen, L. von, Wynne, C. D. L., Delius, J. D., & Staddon, J. E. R. (1991) Transitive inference formation in pigeons. Journal of Experimental Psychology: Animal Behavior Processes, 17, 334-341. 
	
Staddon, J. E. R. (1992) Rationality, melioration and law-of-effect models for choice. Psychological Science, 3, 136-141.
	
Staddon, J. E. R. (1992) The ‘superstition’ experiment: A reversible figure.  Journal of Experimental Psychology: General, 121, 270-272.
	
Higa, J. J., & Staddon, J. E. R. (1993) “Transitive inference” in multiple conditional discriminations.  Journal of the Experimental Analysis of Behavior, 59, 265-291.
	
Higa, J. J., Thaw, J. M., & Staddon, J. E. R. (1993) Pigeons’ wait-time responses to transitions in interfood-interval duration: another look at cyclic schedule performance.  Journal of the Experimental Analysis of Behavior, 59, 529-541.
	
Staddon, J. E. R. (1993) On rate-sensitive habituation.  Adaptive Behavior, 1, 421-436. 
	
Davis, D. G. S., Staddon, J. E. R., Machado, A., & Palmer, R. G. (1993) The process of recurrent choice.  Psychological Review, 100, 320-341.
	
Staddon, J. E. R., Davis, D. G. S., Machado, A., and Palmer, R. G. (1994) The cumulative effects model.  A response to Williams.  Psychological Review, 101, 708-710. 
	
Staddon, J. (1995) On responsibility and punishment.  The Atlantic Monthly, Feb., 88-94. http://dukespace.lib.duke.edu/dspace/handle/10161/5124
	
Wynne, C. D. L., Staddon, J. E. R., & Delius, J. (1996) Dynamics of waiting in pigeons. Journal of the Experimental Analysis of Behavior, 65, 603-618.
	
Staddon, J. E. R., & Higa, J. J. (1996) Multiple time scales in simple habituation.  Psychological Review, 103, 720-733.
	
Reid, A. K., & Staddon, J. E. R. (1997) A reader for the cognitive map. Information Sciences, 100, 217-228.
	
Staddon, J. E. R. (1997) Why behaviorism needs internal states. In L. J. Hayes & P. M. Ghezzi (Eds.) Investigations in behavioral epistemology. Reno, NV: Context Press. Pp. 107-119.
	
Staddon, J. E. R., & Zanutto, B. S. (1997) Feeding dynamics: Why rats eat in meals and what this means for foraging and feeding regulation.  In Learning, motivation and cognition: The functional behaviorism of Robert C. Bolles.  M. E. Bouton & M. S. Fanselow (eds.) Washington: American Psychological Association.  Pp. 131-162.
	
Wynne, C. D. L., & Staddon, J. E. R. (eds.) (1998) Models for Action: Mechanisms for Adaptive Behavior.  New York: Erlbaum.  Pp. x, 318.
	
Reid, A. K., & Staddon, J. E. R. (1998) A dynamic route-finder for the cognitive map. Psychological Review, 105, 585-601. http://dukespace.lib.duke.edu/dspace/handle/10161/7383
	
Staddon, J. E. R., & Chelaru, I. M. (1998) Diffusion-based guidance system for autonomous agents. In  Applications and Science of Computational Intelligence, S. K. Rogers, D. B. Fo-gel, J. C. Bezdek, & B. Bosacchi (Eds.) SPIE Proceedings, 3390, 404-411.
	
Staddon, J. E. R., & Higa, J. J. (1999) Time and memory: Towards a pacemaker-free theory of interval timing.  Journal of the Experimental Analysis of Behavior, 71, 215-251.
	
Staddon, J. E. R., & Higa, J. J. & Chelaru, I. M. (1999) Time, trace, memory. Journal of the Experimental Analysis of Behavior, 71, 293-301. 
	
Staddon, J.  (1999) On responsibility in science and law. Social Philosophy and Policy, 16, 146-174. Reprinted in Responsibility. E. F. Paul, F. D. Miller, & J. Paul (eds.), 1999. Cambridge University Press, pp. 146-174.
http://dukespace.lib.duke.edu/dspace/handle/10161/5986
	
Talton, L. Higa, J. J., & Staddon, J. E. R.  (1999) Interval schedule performance in the goldfish (Carassius auratus). Behavioural Processes, 45, 193-206.
	
Staddon, J. E. R., & Higa, J. J. (1999) The choose-short effect and trace theories of timing. Journal of the Experimental Analysis of Behavior, 72, 473-8.

Cerutti, D. T., Chelaru, I. M., & Staddon, J. E. R. (2000).  Detecting hidden targets:  A procedure for studying performance in a mine-detection-like task.  In Abinash C. Dubey, James F. Harvey, J. Thomas Broach, and Regina E, Dugan, Detection and Remediation Technologies for Mines and Minelike Targets (pp. 102-109).  Washington, DC:  SPIE.	

Staddon, J. E. R. (2000) Consciousness and theoretical behaviorism. American Zoologist, 40, 874-882.

Staddon, J. E. R., Chelaru, I. M., & Higa, J. J.  (2002) A tuned-trace theory of interval-timing dynamics. Journal of the Experimental Analysis of Behavior, 77, 105-124.
	
Staddon, J. E. R. (2002) Memories of Memorial Hall. Journal of the Experimental Analysis of Behavior, 77, 392. 

Cerutti, D. T., & Staddon, J. E. R. (2004) Immediacy vs. anticipated delay in the time-left experiment: A test of the cognitive hypothesis. Journal of Experimental Psychology: Animal Behavior Processes.  30, 45–57.
https://www.ncbi.nlm.nih.gov/pmc/articles/PMC1470760/pdf/nihms-2127.pdf

Staddon, J. E. R.(2004) Scientific imperialism and behaviorist epistemology. Behavior and Philosophy, 32, 231-242. http://dukespace.lib.duke.edu/dspace/handle/10161/3389 
	
Staddon, J. E. R. (2005) Interval timing: Memory, not a clock. Trends in Cognitive Sciences, Vol 9(7), 312-314.

Jozefowiez, J., Cerutti, D. T., & Staddon, J. E. R. (2006) Timescale invariance and Weber’s law in choice. Journal of Experimental Psychology: Animal Behavior Processes, 32, 229-238.
	
Staddon, J. E. R., & Higa, J. J. (2006) Interval timing.  Nature Reviews Neuroscience. 7, 678. August. https://www.nature.com/articles/nrn1764-c1

Staddon, J. (2006) Did Skinner miss the point about teaching? International Journal of Psychology, 41(6), 555-558. http://dukespace.lib.duke.edu/dspace/handle/10161/5119

Zanutto, B. S., Staddon, J. E. R. (2007) Bang-Bang Control of Feeding: Role of hypothalamic and satiety signals. PLoS Computional Biology, 3(5): e97 doi:10.1371/journal.pcbi.0030097
            
Staddon, J. E. R. (2007) Is animal learning optimal?  In  A. Bejan & G. W. Merkx (Eds.) Constructal theory of social dynamics.  Springer Verlag, pp. 161-167.

Staddon, J. E. R. What should we do?  PLoS–Medicine, February 7. https://journals.plos.org/plosmedicine/article/comment?id=10.1371/annotation/1320733f-4efa-4eb3-8077-ac95731f1071

Staddon, J. (2008) Distracting Miss Daisy: Why stop signs and speed limits endanger Americans. The Atlantic, July/August. https://www.theatlantic.com/magazine/archive/2008/07/distracting-miss-daisy/306873/

Staddon, J. (2008) Epilogue. In Reflections on Adaptive Behavior:  Essays in Honor of J. E. R. Staddon. N. K. Innis (Ed. ) Cambridge, MA: MIT Press. Pp. 389-90.
	
Jozefowiez, J., Staddon, J. E. R. & Cerutti, D. T. (2009) Metacognition in animals: how do we know that they know?  Comparative Cognition and Behavior Reviews, 4, 19-29.

Jozefowiez, J., Staddon, J. E. R. & Cerutti, D. T. (2009) The behavioral economics of choice and interval timing.  Psychological Review, 116, 519-539.

J. E. R. Staddon, R.C. MacPhail, and S. Padilla (2010) Dynamics of successive induction in larval zebrafish.  Journal of the Experimental Analysis of Behavior, 94, 261–266.

Staddon, John (2011) Glenn Beck: Why do they hate him so?  http://www.newcriterion.com/posts.cfm/Glenn-Beck--Why-do-they-hate-him-so--6435 

Zanutto, B. S. and Staddon, J. E. R. (2011) Dynamics of Feeding Behavior: Role of Hypothalamic and Satiety Signals. In V.R. Preedy, Watson, R.R; Martin, C.R. et al. (eds.), Handbook of Behavior, Food and Nutrition, Springer Science+Business Media, LLC 2011, pp. 929-939.

Staddon, J. (2013) . Faith, fact and behaviorism. The Behavior Analyst (2013), 36(2) 229-238. https://dukespace.lib.duke.edu/dspace/bitstream/handle/10161/11791/StaddonFaith2013.pdf?sequence=2&isAllowed=y

Cerutti, D. T., Jozefowiez, J., & Staddon, J. E. R. (2013). Rapid, accurate time estimation in zebra fish (Danio rerio). Behavioural Processes, 99, 21-25.
	
Staddon, J. E. R. (2014) On choice and the law of effect. International Journal of Comparative Psychology, 27(4), 569-584. https://escholarship.org/uc/item/1tn9q5ng
	
Jozefowiez, J. Machado, A. & Staddon, J. E. R. (2014) Cognitive versus associative rules in timing. In V. Arstila and Lloyd, D. Subjective time: The philosophy, psychology and neuroscience of temporality, Cambridge, MA: MIT Press. 
	
Staddon. John (2016) Where Operant Conditioning Went Wrong: Why did Skinner’s Innovations Stall? Behavior Analysis Quarterly, 2(3), 18-21.
	
Staddon, John (2016) Theoretical Behaviorism, Economic Theory, and Choice.  In Economizing mind, 1870-2016: When economics and psychology met…or didn’t. Marina Bianchi & Neil De Marchi (Eds.) Duke University Press, 2016.  Pp. 316-331. https://www.researchgate.net/publication/311446403_Theoretical_Behaviorism_Economic_Theory_and_Choice 	

Staddon, J. (2018) Logic of profiling: Fairness vs. efficiency. https://dukespace.lib.duke.edu/dspace/bitstream/handle/10161/2883/Profiling.pdf?sequence=42019 

Staddon, J. (2019) Object of Inquiry: Psychology’s Other (Non-replication) Problem  Academic Questions. 32, 246-256. 
https://dukespace.lib.duke.edu/dspace/handle/10161/18551
	
Staddon, J. (2020) Facts vs. passion: The debate over science-based regulation.  Academic Questions, 33, 101-110. https://www.nas.org/academic-questions/33/1/facts-vs-passion-the-debate-over-science-based-regulation 

Staddon, J. (2020) Variation and diversity: A tribute to Freeman Dyson. Academic Questions, 33(3) 436-447. https://www.ncbi.nlm.nih.gov/pmc/articles/PMC7371834/

Staddon, J. (2020) What’s Really Wrong with America. Academic Questions, 33(4), 586-591. https://www.nas.org/academic-questions/33/4/whats-really-wrong-with-america

Staddon, J. (2021) History of science: Politicizing a discipline. Academic Questions, 34(1) 20-30. https://www.nas.org/academic-questions/34/1/history-of-science-politicizing-a-discipline

Staddon, J. (2021) The Behaviorist plot, A Review of  Rebecca Lemov, World as Laboratory: Mice, Mazes and Men (Hill and Wang, e-book 2011). Academic Questions, Summer, 34(2) 57-63. https://www.nas.org/academic-questions/34/2/the-behaviorist-plot

Zane, P and JERS  Wall Street Journal, J Feb 19 2021 https://www.wsj.com/articles/science-needs-criticism-not-cheerleading-11613772365

Staddon, John Why Can’t Academia Tolerate Dissent on Biological Sex? National Review, May 20, 2021. https://www.nationalreview.com/2021/05/why-cant-academia-tolerate-dissent-on-biological-sex/

Staddon, J. (2021) The devolution of psychological science: Memes, culture and systemic racism. Academic Questions, Fall, 2021, 34(3) 42-47. https://www.nas.org/academic-questions/34/3/the-devolution-of-psychological-science-memes-culture-and-systemic-racism

Staddon, J. (2021) The diversity dilemma. Academic Questions, Fall, 2021, (34(3) 109-111. https://www.nas.org/academic-questions/34/3/the-diversity-dilemma

Staddon, J. Unlucky Strike: Private health and the science, law and politics of smoking.  Second edition.  (2022 PsyCrit Press)

Honig, W. K. & Staddon, J. E. R. Handbook of Operant Behavior, Classic Edition (Psy-chology Press & Routledge, 2022) 

Staddon, J. Science in an age of unreason (Regnery, 2022)	

Staddon, J. The Faith of Science Academic Questions Summer. 2022.
https://www.nas.org/academic-questions/35/2/the-faith-of-science

Staddon, J. Stratification Economics: How Social Science Fails. Academic Questions winter, 2022.
https://www.nas.org/academic-questions/35/4/stratification-economics-how-social-science-fails

External links
 Scholars at Duke

Living people
21st-century American psychologists
Duke University faculty
Alumni of University College London
Harvard University alumni
1937 births
20th-century American psychologists